The 1976 Harlow District Council election took place on 6 May 1976 to elect members of Harlow District Council in Essex, England. This was on the same day as other local elections. The Labour Party retained control of the council.

Election result

Ward results

Brays Grove (3 seats)

Great Parndon (2 seats)

Hare Street and Town Centre (2 seats)

Katherines With Sumner (2 seats)

Kingsmoor (3 seats)

Latton Bush (3 seats)

Little Parndon (3 seats)

Mark Hall North (2 seats)

Mark Hall South (3 seats)

Netteswell East (2 seats)

Netteswell West (2 seats)

Old Harlow (3 seats)

Passmores (3 seats)

Potter Street (3 seats)

Stewards (3 seats)

Tye Green (3 seats)

References

1976
1976 English local elections
1970s in Essex